Samcheong-dong is a dong, neighbourhood of Jongno-gu in Seoul, South Korea. It lies north of Jongno and east of Gyeongbokgung. This hilly neighborhood is characterized by numerous small art galleries, shops, and restaurants. Visitors to the area can see restored hanok, Korean traditional-style houses. The Board of Audit and Inspection of Korea is located here. It is also home to several foreign government offices including the Vietnamese consulate.

Attraction 
National Folk Museum of Korea
Velvet and Incubator art galleries

See also
Administrative divisions of South Korea

References

External links
 Jongno-gu Official site in English
 Jongno-gu Official site
 Status quo of Jongno-gu by administrative dong 
 Samcheong-dong Resident office 
 Origin of Samcheong-dong name
 Official site of Korea tourism on Samcheong-dong

Neighbourhoods of Jongno-gu
Tourist attractions in Seoul